John Peter Doherty (12 March 1935 – 13 November 2007) was an English footballer. His regular position was at inside right.

Born in Manchester, Doherty started his professional career with Manchester United in 1952. He was part of the United squad that won the 1955–56 league title and scored seven goals in 26 appearances. In October 1957, he was transferred to Leicester City for £6,500. His exit from Old Trafford came just before eight of his United colleagues lost their lives in the Munich air disaster; he was in a Leicester hospital undergoing surgery for a knee injury when he heard the news.

He left Leicester after only one season due to his knee related problems, before moving on to Rugby Town, and then to Altrincham.

In the autumn of 1958, when Arsenal made an offer to Manchester United assistant manager Jimmy Murphy to become their new manager, Murphy offered Doherty the chance to become his assistant if he took charge at the North London club. However, Murphy then decided against moving to Arsenal and the partnership never happened

As of 2006, John was chairman of the Former Manchester United Players Association and co-authored the book The Insider's Guide to Manchester United with Ivan Ponting, where he gave his opinion of over 300 United players (including himself) since 1950. He was the driving force behind a friendly match at Old Trafford in 1998 to raise money for the families of the Munich victims on the disaster's 40th anniversary.

Doherty died of lung cancer in November 2007 at the age of 72.

References

External links

1935 births
2007 deaths
English footballers
Manchester United F.C. players
Leicester City F.C. players
Altrincham F.C. players
Rugby Town F.C. (1945) players
Bangor City F.C. managers
Association football inside forwards
English football managers